St Padarn's Institute came into being in 2016.  Until then the site belonged to St Michael's College, an Anglican theological college in Llandaff, Wales. St Michael's college was founded in Aberdare in 1892, and was situated in Llandaff from 1907 until 2016.
Among its many alumni was the poet R. S. Thomas. The original building on the site was a house constructed for himself by John Prichard. After his death, that building was incorporated into the newly-founded St Michael's College, which was built mainly to the designs of F. R. Kempson between 1905-1907. In the late 1950s, a chapel was built by George Pace. The college had significant financial problems in the early 21st century and was eventually closed.  

The site was purchased by the Church in Wales in 2016 to be used as a residential training college for its full time ministers.

History and development
John Prichard was a noted ecclesiastical architect who undertook much church building and restoration in Wales, often in partnership with John Pollard Seddon. He established a practice in Llandaff, Cardiff, becoming 'Resident Diocesan Architect' in December 1844. In the mid-1860s, he began the building of a house, and attached office on the site of the future St Michael's. Following his death in 1886, control passed to the Church of England, which began the building of a residential seminary for the training of priests. The main college buildings were designed by F. R. Kempson and built between 1904-1907. In the 1950s, a college chapel was designed by George Pace.

In 2016, following a review, A report on the future of theological training in the Church in Wales, the college closed as a residential centre, with the training of priests devolved to individual dioceses. St Padarn's Institute took over the old St Michael's buildings and the mandate for training Welsh Priests and other licensed ministers was centralised at St Padarn's at the end of 2016.  The Cardiff site became the home for  residential and administration activities, but with training taking place under the name of St Padarn's Institute for all Church in Wales licensed and ordained ministers across the whole of Wales.

Postgraduate courses in Chaplaincy studies, Youth, Children and Family Specialisms and general Theology developed under the umbrella of St Padarn's, with students attending from all parts of the UK.  A strong doctoral programme has also developed there.  Through a programme called Theology for Life St Padarns also provides a part time degree course to hundreds of people across Wales.

Architecture and description
The architectural historian John Newman, writing in his Glamorgan Pevsner, describes the design of Prichard's office and house as "sprightly". He is less complimentary about F. R. Kempson's large-scale additions for the college, which he considers "bland and uninspired". Prichard's building uses a polychromatic blend of rubble and blue brick with stone dressings, while Kempson deployed sandstone with Bath stone dressings. The most highly regarding building in the complex is the chapel by Pace. Constructed to a Modernist design, Newman notes the influence of Le Corbusier's Notre-Dame du Haut. The chapel is designated a Grade I listed building, while the college, and a block of three apartments within it, are designated Grade II.

Leadership

Wardens of St Michael's College
 Glyn Simon (later Bishop of Llandaff and Archbishop of Wales)
 Eryl Stephen Thomas (later Bishop of Monmouth and Bishop of Llandaff)
 Harold John Charles (later Bishop of St Asaph)
 O. G. Rees
 John Hughes (later Bishop of Kensington)
 John Rowlands
 John Holdsworth
 Peter Sedgwick  2004-2014
 Mark Clavier (Acting principal) 2014-2016

Principals of  St Padarn's Institute
 Revd Professor Jeremy Duff (married to Jill Duff, the Bishop of Lancaster)

Deans of St Padarn's Institute 

 Revd Dr Manon Ceridwen James  
 Revd Dr Mark Griffiths JP

Alumni

Leonard Hodgson 
Alwyn Rice Jones (Bishop of St Asaph and Archbishop of Wales)
R. S. Thomas (poet and priest)
John David Edward Davies (Archbishop of Wales and Bishop of Swansea and Brecon)
Gregory Kenneth Cameron (Bishop of St Asaph)
John Wyn Evans (Bishop of St David's)
Richard Pain (Bishop of Monmouth)
Paul Groves (poet and critic) 
Martin Dudley (priest)
Raymond Roberts (Chaplain of the Fleet)

References

Sources 
 
 

Anglican seminaries and theological colleges
Church in Wales
 
Educational institutions established in 1892
1892 establishments in Wales
Llandaff
Grade II listed buildings in Cardiff
Grade II* listed buildings in Cardiff
Former theological colleges in Wales